Chris Squire's Swiss Choir is the second and final solo album by Chris Squire. An album of traditional Christmas music, it was released in 2007 and includes former Genesis guitarist Steve Hackett, future King Crimson drummer and keyboardist Jeremy Stacey and the English Baroque Choir.

All tracks were arranged by Chris Squire and Gerard Johnson.

Track listing

Personnel
Chris Squire – bass guitar, vocals
Steve Hackett – electric and acoustic guitars
Gerard Johnson – keyboards
Jeremy Stacey – drums
English Baroque Choir – chorus 
Jeremy Jackman – vocals, musical direction
Amy George – soprano voice 
Laura Macara – vocals 
Alan White – drums, piano, keyboards, backing vocals on "Run with the Fox".

References

Chris Squire albums
2007 Christmas albums
Christmas albums by English artists